In enzymology, a quinoline 2-oxidoreductase is an enzyme that catalyzes the chemical reaction

quinoline + acceptor + H2O  quinolin-1(2H)-one + reduced acceptor

The 3 substrates of this enzyme are quinoline, acceptor, and H2O, whereas its two products are quinolin-1(2H)-one and reduced acceptor.

This enzyme belongs to the family of oxidoreductases, specifically those acting on the CH-CH group of donor with other acceptors.  The systematic name of this enzyme class is quinoline:acceptor 2-oxidoreductase (hydroxylating).

Structural studies
As of late 2007, only one structure has been solved for this class of enzymes, with the PDB accession code .

References

 
 
 
 

EC 1.3.99
Enzymes of known structure